WRRJ (89.7 FM) is a radio station licensed to serve the community of Cocoa Beach, Florida. The station is owned by Black Media Works, Inc., and airs a reggae/island music format.

The station was assigned the WRRJ call letters by the Federal Communications Commission on June 4, 2015.

References

External links
 Official Website
 
 

RRJ
Radio stations established in 2015
2015 establishments in Florida
Brevard County, Florida